Cyanea crispa is a rare species of flowering plant known by the common names crimped rollandia and Koolau Range rollandia. It is endemic to Oahu, where there are no more than fifty individuals remaining in the Koʻolau Range. It is a federally listed endangered species of the United States. Like other Cyanea it is known as haha in Hawaiian.

The plant occurs in several types of habitat in the Koʻolau Mountains, including open moist forest and the shady understory of wet forest. The remaining 30 to 50 plants are divided among five populations, but three of the populations have only one plant each. Threats to the species include its small numbers and habitat destruction and degradation by feral pigs, rats, slugs, and exotic plants such as Koster's curse (Clidemia hirta) and thimbleberry (Rubus rosifolius).

This Hawaiian lobelioid is a shrub with a succulent stem topped with a cluster of leaves. The inflorescence contains 3 to 8 red flowers with purple-striped petals.

The plant is being propagated and the seeds collected.

References

External links
USDA Plants Profile

crispa
Endemic flora of Hawaii
Biota of Oahu